The nForce 700 is a chipset series designed by Nvidia first released in December 2007. The series supports both Intel Core 2 and AMD Phenom processors, and replaces the nForce 600 series chipsets. Several members were spotted, including the codenamed MCP72 for AMD processors and the C72 for Intel processors, launched with the name "nForce 780a" and "nForce 780i" chipsets respectively. Currently, the released variants are the 750i, 780i, 790i, and 790i Ultra.

AMD chipsets
The memory controller is built-in into the CPU, the supported memory type depends on the CPU and socket used. This way there are no supported memory types listed here.

nForce 780a SLI
Codenamed MCP72XE
Motherboard GPU (mGPU): GeForce 8200
DirectX 10 compliant
PureVideo HD
Addition of the nForce 200 PCI-E bridge (previously codenamed BR-04)
Connected to the northbridge via a 4.5 GT/s proprietary bus using the PCI-E interface
Support for PCI-E 2.0 
Triple SLI
Slot 1: full speed PCI Express 2.0 ×16 slot from nForce 200
Slot 2: full speed PCI Express 2.0 ×8 slot from nForce 200
Slot 3: full speed PCI Express 2.0 ×8 slot from nForce 200 
Hybrid SLI
GeForce Boost
HybridPower
Support HT 3.0

nForce 750a
Codenamed MCP72P
Motherboard GPU (mGPU): GeForce 8200
DirectX 10 compliant
PureVideo HD
Support for PCI-E 2.0
SLI
Hybrid SLI
GeForce Boost
HybridPower
Support HT 3.0

nForce 725a
Codenamed MCP78U
Motherboard GPU (mGPU): GeForce 8300
DirectX 10 compliant
PureVideo HD
DTS-HD and Dolby TrueHD 7.1 channel surround sound support (rumored beforehand, not implemented)
Support for PCI-E 2.0
Hybrid SLI
GeForce Boost
HybridPower
Support HT 3.0

nForce 720a
Codenamed MCP78S
Motherboard GPU (mGPU): GeForce 8200
DirectX 10 compliant
PureVideo HD
DTS-HD and Dolby TrueHD 7.1 channel surround sound support (rumored beforehand, not implemented)
Support for PCI-E 2.0
Hybrid SLI
GeForce Boost
HybridPower
Support HT 3.0
Connect up to two display monitors
Via DisplayPort, HDMI, DVI or D-Sub

Intel chipsets

nForce 7xx

The nForce 780i and 750i chipsets features the nForce 200 PCI-E bridge (previously codenamed BR-04) connected to the northbridge via a 4.5 GT/s proprietary bus. Its function is to implement the lack of PCI-E 2.0 support from the northbridge.

MCP7A
Three versions:
MCP7A-U
MCP7A-S
MCP7A-H (No IGP and Hybrid SLI)
motherboard GPU (mGPU)
DirectX 10 compliant
PureVideo HD
One PCI-E 2.0 x16 slot
Hybrid SLI
GeForce Boost
HybridPower
Supports a maximum of DDR2-800 dual-channel memory
Support 1333 MHz FSB
Connect up to two display monitors
Via DisplayPort, HDMI, DVI or D-Sub

See also
List of Intel chipsets
Comparison of Nvidia chipsets

References

Nvidia chipsets